The Palácio das Indústrias is a historical building in São Paulo, under the protection of the Council for the Defense of Historical, Archaeological, Artistic and Tourist Heritage (CONDEPHAAT). 

It is a representative of the Eclectic style and was designed for hosting industrial exhibitions.

The first exhibition was held there in 1917. It was converted into a legislative assembly in 1947 and its name was changed to the "Palácio Nove de Julho" (Ninth of July, commemorating the Constitutionalist Revolution). In the 1970s, it also served as the home of the Public Security Secretariat and contained some jail cells.

In 1992, after restorations by the architect Lina Bo Bardi, it served briefly as the City Hall. Since 2009, it has been the home of the  science museum.

References

External links 

 O Estado de S. Paulo Palácio das Indústrias vira museu da ciência em SP (20 March 2009) 
 TV Gazeta Palácio das Indústrias passa por restauração (12 December 2015)

Museums in São Paulo